Vihiga United are a football team from Mbale vihiga county currently playing in the Kenya Premier League, having been promoted for the 2018 season.

Their colours are green and yellow.

They were captained by Bernard Ochieng during their maiden KPL season in 2018. Ochieng was also in the mix to represent the Kenya national team during the season. Vihiga upset champions Gor Mahia 2-0 late in the season which nearly ensured they would avoid relegation back to the second division and ended up finishing their maiden premier league season in 12th position.

See also 

 Vihiga Queens

References

Kenyan Premier League clubs
Football clubs in Kenya